Menashe Zemro (born 1905 or 1906; died 7 October 1998 at age 92) was the last Kes of the Ethiopian Jews.

Biography 
Zemro was born in Gondar, Ethiopia around the year 1906.

Through Operation Solomon, Zemro, a kes, would migrate with most of the Beta Israel community in 1991 to Israel. After making aliyah, he would continue to serve as a spiritual leader in Israel for the Beta Israel community.

Zemro would go on to settle in Kiryat Gat, where he would later die, on 7 October 1998. Adisu Massala, a Knesset member who had migrated from Ethiopia, would describe the deceased spiritual leader as the greatest of the generation.

References 

People from Gondar

Kahant (Beta Israel)
1998 deaths
People from Kiryat Gat
Israeli people of Ethiopian-Jewish descent